Cascinette d'Ivrea is a comune (municipality) in the Metropolitan City of Turin in the Italian region Piedmont, located about  northeast of Turin.

Cascinette d'Ivrea borders the following municipalities: Chiaverano, Burolo, and Ivrea.

References

Cities and towns in Piedmont